Ocinara dilectula is a moth in the family Bombycidae. It was described by Francis Walker in 1856. It is found on Java and possibly Sumatra.

The wingspan is 22–31 mm. The forewings are reddish brown.

The larvae have been recorded feeding on Ficus benjaminiana.

References

Bombycidae
Moths described in 1856